Mitrantia is a genus of plant in family Myrtaceae described as a genus in 1988. It contains only one known species, Mitrantia bilocularis, endemic to the State of Queensland in northeastern Australia.

References

Myrtaceae
Critically endangered plants
Endemic flora of Queensland
Monotypic Myrtaceae genera
Taxa named by Bernard Hyland